Frank Kurt Zander (born 4 February 1942, Berlin) is a German singer and actor.

Life
Zander works in Germany as singer and actor. Zander lives in Berlin and in Ibiza.

A fan of the German football club Hertha BSC, Zander wrote the club's current anthem "Nur Nach Hause", to the melody of Rod Stewarts "We are Sailing". The song is performed by supporters as the team enters the field at every Hertha home game at the Olympiastadion in Berlin.
The song "Da da da" peaked at number 48 in Australia in 1982.

For many years, Zander supports charities that help the homeless. He has received a number of awards for this.

Songs
 1975: "Der Ur-Ur-Enkel von Frankenstein"
 1974: "Ich trink auf dein Wohl, Marie"
 1976: "Oh, Susi (der zensierte Song)"
 1978: "Disco Planet (Wir beamen)"
 1981: "Ja, wenn wir alle Englein wären" (Ententanz) under his Pseudonym "Fred Sonnenschein und seine Freunde"
 1989: "Hier kommt Kurt"
 1990: Teenage Mutant Hero Turtles title song (German dub)
 2007: "Hier kommt Knut"

Awards
 2002: Order of Merit of the Federal Republic of Germany

References

External links
 Official website by Frank Zander
 
 
 

German male singers
German male television actors
Living people
1942 births
Recipients of the Cross of the Order of Merit of the Federal Republic of Germany
Recipients of the Order of Merit of Berlin